Walloon Lake is a glacier-formed lake located in Charlevoix and Emmet counties, just southwestward from the northern tip of the  Lower Peninsula of Michigan. It is now home to many vacation homes and cottages. The Bear River drains from the east end of the lake in Walloon Lake village, winding east then north down to its outflow into Lake Michigan at the south end of Petoskey.

Ecology
Locals refer to their cottages as being on the "west arm", or the "foot", etc. Recently, the introduction of the invasive zebra mussel has made the clear waters even clearer. For a few months after the ice melts (usually in April), it is possible to see to the bottom of the lake at depths up to 30 feet.

Current use
Real-estate value has increased rapidly since the 1970s, and many large houses have been built around the lake. There are two currently active camps on the lake: Camp Daggett and Camp Michigania built on the site of the prior Camp Huntington/Sherwood which was purchased in 1962 by the University of Michigan's Alumni Association. Starting around 2010, the area on the foot of the lake began redevelopment. New condominiums were constructed. In the next few years, a restaurant was built, and a retail store was created on the site of the old SI's marine. In 2014 developers broke ground on a new hotel to sit in between the marina and condominiums.

Transportation
Indian Trails provides daily intercity bus service between St. Ignace and East Lansing, Michigan.

Historic sites

Windemere

Located on the north shore of Walloon Lake, Windemere was the childhood summer home of Ernest Hemingway. The house is still owned by the Hemingway family and is home to one of Hemingway's nephews.

The Walloon Lake Inn
Originally named Fern Cottage, the inn was a destination point for many visitors and also served as a docking point for the steamboats that would take the travelers to hotels or to their cottages on the lake. The inn has been renovated over the last thirty years and now serves the community as a fine dining restaurant. The inn also houses a French-style restaurant and a culinary school.

See also
List of lakes in Michigan

References

External links
Michigan DNR map of Walloon Lake
 Walloon Lake Association, Trust and Conservancy
 
 Tip of the Mitt Watershed Council

Lakes of Michigan
Lakes of Charlevoix County, Michigan
Lakes of Emmet County, Michigan